"The Morning Breaks, the Shadows Flee" is an 1840 hymn written by Latter Day Saint apostle Parley P. Pratt.

The lyrics to the hymn were first published in May 1840 as a poem on the outside cover of the inaugural issue of the Millennial Star, a periodical of the Church of Jesus Christ of Latter Day Saints published in England. When the church published its Manchester Hymnal later that year, "The Morning Breaks, the Shadows Flee" was the first hymn in the work. Since the Manchester Hymnal was published, the song has often been the first song in hymnals published by the Church of Jesus Christ of Latter-day Saints (LDS Church). It is hymn number 1 in the current LDS Church hymnal under the shortened title, "The Morning Breaks".

In 1864, George Careless composed music to accompany Pratt's poem. The Mormon Tabernacle Choir adopted Careless's rendition and it has since become one of the choir's standard numbers.

The hymn has five verses and centers on the theme that God has restored the gospel to the earth.

See also
Praise to the Man, 2009 Mormon Tabernacle Choir album

References
Terryl L. Givens and Matthew J. Grow (2011). Parley P. Pratt: The Apostle Paul of Mormonism (New York: Oxford University Press) pp. 179–80
David Maxwell, "'The Morning Breaks': George Careless, Musical Pioneer", Ensign, February 1984 
"Latter-day Saint Hymns: 'The Morning Breaks, the Shadows Flee'", Millennial Star, vol. 88, no. 2 (14 January 1926) pp. 28–31

External links
"The Morning Breaks, the Shadows Flee", text in Mormon Literature Database
The Morning Breaks  churchofjesuschrist.org

1840 poems
1864 songs
1840 in Christianity
Latter Day Saint hymns
Works originally published in Millennial Star

Works by Parley P. Pratt
Works by apostles (LDS Church)